William C. Cowling was a member of the Wisconsin State Assembly.

Biography
Cowling was born on July 2, 1872 in Oshkosh, Wisconsin. For a time, he served as editor of the Oshkosh Northwestern.

Political career
Cowling was elected to the Assembly in 1902. He was a Republican.

References

Politicians from Oshkosh, Wisconsin
Republican Party members of the Wisconsin State Assembly
Editors of Wisconsin newspapers
1872 births
Year of death missing